Jonas Björkman was the defending champion but lost in the semifinals to Mardy Fish.

Greg Rusedski won in the final 6–3, 6–2 against Fish.

Seeds

  Younes El Aynaoui (second round)
  Mikhail Youzhny (first round)
  Jarkko Nieminen (first round)
  Vince Spadea (first round)
  Jan-Michael Gambill (first round)
  Max Mirnyi (second round)
  Taylor Dent (quarterfinals, withdrew because of a back injury)
  Mardy Fish (final)

Draw

Finals

Top half

Bottom half

External links
 2003 Nottingham Open Singles draw

Nottingham Open
2003 ATP Tour